Milan Vještica (Serbian Cyrillic: Милан Вјештица; born 15 November 1979) is a retired Serbian professional footballer who played as a defender.

Club career
Vještica began his professional football career with Novi Sad in the late 1990s. He spent several seasons with the Canaries playing in the lower leagues, before moving to their cross-town rivals Vojvodina in the summer of 2001. Vještica stayed just a half a season there, joining Russian club Zenit Saint Petersburg during the 2002 winter transfer window. He spent five seasons at Petrovsky Stadium between 2002 and 2006. In January 2008, Vještica signed a contract with Partizan. In January 2012, Vještica signed a contract with Ural Yekaterinburg. The following year, he helped Ural to win promotion to the Premier League. After the first part of the 2013–14 season, his contract with the club was terminated by mutual consent. On 14 February 2014, Dynamo Saint Petersburg announced the signing of Vještica on a permanent basis.

International career
Vještica made one appearance for the Yugoslav national under-21 team during the qualification campaign for the 2002 UEFA Under-21 Championship.

Statistics

Honours

Club
Zenit Saint Petersburg
 Russian Premier League Cup: 2003
Partizan
 Serbian SuperLiga: 2007–08
 Serbian Cup: 2007–08
Ural Yekaterinburg
 Russian Football National League: 2012–13

Individual
 Russian Football National League Best Defender: 2010

References

External links
 RFPL profile
 

Association football defenders
Expatriate footballers in Russia
FC Dynamo Saint Petersburg players
FC Rostov players
FC Shinnik Yaroslavl players
FC Ural Yekaterinburg players
FC Zenit Saint Petersburg players
FC Zhemchuzhina Sochi players
RFK Novi Sad 1921 players
FK Partizan players
FK Vojvodina players
Russian Premier League players
Serbia and Montenegro expatriate footballers
Serbia and Montenegro footballers
Serbia and Montenegro expatriate sportspeople in Russia
Serbia and Montenegro under-21 international footballers
Serbian expatriate footballers
Serbian expatriate sportspeople in Russia
Serbian footballers
Serbian SuperLiga players
Footballers from Novi Sad
1979 births
Living people